Gavin Mark Marshall (born 25 March 1960) is a former Australian politician, who was an Australian Labor Party member of the Australian Senate from July 2002 until June 2019, representing the state of Victoria.

Marshall was born in Melbourne and was an electrician and official with the Electrical Trades Union before entering politics.

On 7 July 2014, Marshall was elected Deputy President of the Senate, serving in that position until 9 May 2016.

References

External links
http://www.gavinmarshall.org/ personal web site
 Summary of parliamentary voting for Senator Gavin Marshall on TheyVoteForYou.org.au

1960 births
Living people
Australian Labor Party members of the Parliament of Australia
Members of the Australian Senate
Members of the Australian Senate for Victoria
Trade unionists from Melbourne
Australian electricians
Labor Left politicians
21st-century Australian politicians
People from Reservoir, Victoria
Politicians from Melbourne